William Charles Hill (5 May 1838 – 11 January 1919) was an Australian politician.

He was born in Sydney to Richard Hill and Henrietta Cox, but grew up in rural areas. He was a partner in a woolbrokers' firm, and on 20 August 1874 married Alice Smith, with whom he had a daughter. He was a pastoralist and stock agent, and in 1900 was appointed to the New South Wales Legislative Council, where he served until his death at Woollahra in 1919.

See also
 Political families of Australia: Wentworth/Hill/Griffiths/Scott/Cooper family

References

1838 births
1919 deaths
Nationalist Party of Australia members of the Parliament of New South Wales
Members of the New South Wales Legislative Council